RIO Washingtonian Center, stylized as rio, is a  hybrid power center and lifestyle center with shopping, restaurants, and entertainment in Gaithersburg, Maryland located immediately south of the interchange between Interstate 270 and 370. The original RIO building opened in 1982, while the adjacent "Washingtonian Center" and "Washingtonian Waterfront" were developed in 1997 and 2004. It underwent a $30 million renovation in 2020. The center is adjacent to the U.S. headquarters for Sodexo and four Marriott-branded hotels.

Anchors
A two-lane imitation "main street" with small shops and parking garages is anchored by four big-box stores:
 Barnes & Noble
 Dick’s Sporting Goods
 Kohl's
 Target

An adjacent artificial 9-acre lake featuring additional restaurants, hotels, a carousel, and paddle boats is anchored by AMC "Dine-In" Theaters.

Gallery

References

Shopping malls in Maryland
Power centers (retail) in the United States
Buildings and structures in Gaithersburg, Maryland
Lifestyle centers (retail)
Shopping malls in the Washington metropolitan area
Ersatz downtowns